Representation is a quarterly peer-reviewed academic journal covering representative democracy. The editors-in-chief are Stephen Elstub and Maarja Lühiste (Newcastle University). The journal was established in 1960 and is published by Routledge on behalf of the McDougall Trust. The Representation and Electoral Systems specialist section of the American Political Science Association has adopted this journal and provides it for free to its membership.

References

External links

Routledge academic journals
Publications established in 1960
English-language journals
Quarterly journals
Political science journals